The 2016 V.League 1 (known as the Toyota V.League 1 for sponsorship reasons) season was the 60th season of the V.League 1, the highest division of Football in Vietnam. It began on 20 February 2016 and ended 18 September 2016.

Changes from last season

Team changes
The following teams had changed division since the 2015 season.

To V.League 1
Promoted from V.League 2
 Saigon FC

From V.League 1
Relegated to 2016 V.League 2
 Dong Nai FC

Rule changes
In season 2016, the club finishing in the 14th position would be relegated to V-League 2. The club that had finished in the 13th position would face the winner of a play-off between the V-League 2's second, third and fourth place clubs for a place in the 2017 V.League 1 season.

Name changes
Dong Tam Long An changed their name to Long An FC in December 2015.

In April 2016 with only four matches remaining, promoted side Hanoi FC relocated to Ho Chi Minh City and renamed Saigon FC. This was with only four matchdays played

Teams

Personnel and kits

Managerial changes

Foreign players
V.League teams are allowed to use two foreign players and one naturalised player

League table

Results

Play-off match 
The team finishing 13th faced the winner of 2016 V.League 2 play-off II match.

Long An FC won the match and would remain in the 2017 V.League 1.

Positions by round

Season statistics

Top scorers

Own goals

Hattrick

Awards

Monthly awards

Annual awards

Manager of the Season
 Chu Đình Nghiêm (Hanoi T&T)

Best player of the Season
 Gastón Merlo (SHB Danang)

Best young player of the Season
 Vũ Văn Thanh (Hoang Anh Gia Lai)

Dream Team

See also 
 2016 V.League 2
 2016 Vietnamese National Football Second League
 2016 Vietnamese National Football Third League

References

External links

2016
Vietnam
Vietnam
1